The Emergency Afghan Allies Extension Act of 2014 is a United States federal law that authorizes an additional 1,000 emergency Special Immigrant Visas that the United States Department of State could issue to Afghan translators who served with U.S. troops during the War in Afghanistan.

The bill was introduced into the United States House of Representatives during the 113th United States Congress. It was signed into law on August 8, 2014 by President Barack Obama.

Background
During the War in Afghanistan, the United States promised some Afghans protection in exchange for being translators for the U.S. In 2009, the United States began issuing 3,000 visas each year to Afghans, and their families, who helped the United States during the war, usually by being an interpreter or a guide.

Provisions of the bill
This summary is based largely on the summary provided by the Congressional Research Service, a public domain source.

The bill would amend the Afghan Allies Protection Act of 2009 to increase by 1,000 the number of Afghan special immigrant visas available in FY2014.

The bill would require, with regard to such visas, that:

the period during which an alien must have been employed must terminate by December 31, 2014,
the principal alien seeking special immigrant status shall apply to the Chief of Mission by December 31, 2014, and
the authority to provide such status shall terminate on December 31, 2014.

The bill would direct the United States Secretary of State, by January 1, 2015, to increase temporarily the fee or surcharge (by $1) for processing machine-readable nonimmigrant visas and machine-readable combined border crossing identification cards and nonimmigrant visas.

Procedural history
The Emergency Afghan Allies Extension Act of 2014 was introduced into the United States House of Representatives on July 24, 2014 by Rep. Earl Blumenauer (D-OR). The bill was referred to the United States House Committee on the Judiciary and the United States House Committee on Foreign Affairs. On July 30, 2014, the House voted to pass the bill in a voice vote. The Senate passed the bill on August 1, 2014 and President Barack Obama signed it into law on August 8, 2014.

Debate and discussion
According to Rep. Blumenauer, who sponsored the bill, there was "need for immediate action because the State Department has confirmed they have completely exhausted all visas Congress authorized in December." Blumenauer argued that "a failure to provide these additional visas ensures the many brave translators the U.S. promised to protect in exchange for their services would be left in Afghanistan, hiding, their lives still threatened daily by the Taliban."

See also
Withdrawal of U.S. troops from Afghanistan (2011–2016)

References

External links

Library of Congress - Thomas H.R. 5195
beta.congress.gov H.R. 5195
GovTrack.us H.R. 5195
OpenCongress.org H.R. 5195
WashingtonWatch.com H.R. 5195

United States federal immigration and nationality legislation
United States federal defense and national security legislation
Acts of the 113th United States Congress